Kristijan Trapanovski (Macedonian: Кристијан Трапановски; born 14 August 1999) is a Macedonian professional footballer who currently plays for Shkupi as a left winger.

Club career
Born in Bitola, Trapanovski started playing football for the youth team of Akademija Pandev until the summer in 2015, when he got promoted to the senior team of the club, competing in the Macedonian Third League. He performed at Akademija Pandev for 2 consecutive seasons and helped the team advance from the third to the first division within only 2 years. Then, in the summer of 2017, after reaching the top Macedonian tier he decided to continue his career abroad by signing for SK Slavia Prague. Four months later, on 28 February 2018, he got loaned to Slovakian side FC Tatran Prešov to get some playing experience on senior level playing in the first Slovak division. During the 6-month loan he made 4 appearances for the club, in all of them coming in as a substitute from the bench.

International career
Trapanovski has been a regular member of Macedonian U-17 and U-19 national teams. On 24 May 2018 he also made his debut for Macedonia U-21 in a friendly match against Azerbaijan.

References

External links
 

1999 births
Living people
Sportspeople from Bitola
Association football forwards
Macedonian footballers
North Macedonia under-21 international footballers
North Macedonia youth international footballers
Akademija Pandev players
SK Slavia Prague players
1. FC Tatran Prešov players
FK Viktoria Žižkov players
FK Železiarne Podbrezová players
Slovak Super Liga players
Czech National Football League players
2. Liga (Slovakia) players
Macedonian expatriate footballers
Expatriate footballers in the Czech Republic
Macedonian expatriate sportspeople in the Czech Republic
Expatriate footballers in Slovakia
Macedonian expatriate sportspeople in Slovakia